A moth is an insect in the order Lepidoptera.

Moth may also refer to:

Places
 Moth, Uttar Pradesh, a town in Jhansi district, Uttar Pradesh, India

Music
 Moth (album), an album by Chairlift
 Moth (band), a rock band from Cincinnati, Ohio 
 The Moths!, an English indie rock band
 Moth / Wolf Cub, an EP by Burial and Four Tet
 "Moth", a song by Audioslave from Revelations
 "Moths", a song by Jethro Tull from Heavy Horses

Film and television
 The Moth (Lost), the 7th episode of Lost
 The Moth (1917 film), an American film starring Norma Talmadge
 The Moth (1934 film), an American film starring Sally O'Neil
 The Moth (1980 film), a Polish film
 The Moth, a 1997 TV film starring Juliet Aubrey

Transport
 De Havilland Moth, a series of light aircraft, sports planes and military trainers
 Moth (dinghy), three different classes of sailing boats

People
 Gustav Moths, German rower who competed in the 1900 Olympics

Fictional places and characters
 Moth - fairy in Shakespeare's A Midsummer Night's Dream
 Moth (character), a fictional superhero

Organizations
The Moth, a non-profit storytelling group
 Memorable Order of Tin Hats, a war veterans' organization

Other uses
 Moth bean, grown especially in dry parts of South Asia for its tiny edible beans
 Moths, 1880 novel by Ouida
 Moths, play by Henry Hamilton (playwright) from the Ouida novel
 The Moth (magazine), an Irish international arts and literature quarterly
 "The Moths" (short story) by Helena Maria Viramontes
 The Moth, a 1986 novel by Catherine Cookson